Carlos Alcaraz was the defending champion but chose not to defend his title.

Gastão Elias won the title after defeating Holger Rune 5–7, 6–4, 6–4 in the final.

Seeds

Draw

Finals

Top half

Bottom half

References

External links
Main draw
Qualifying draw

Open de Oeiras IV - 1